The 2010 United States Senate election in Kansas took place on November 2, 2010, alongside other elections to the United States Senate in other states as well as elections to the United States House of Representatives and various state and local elections. Incumbent Republican U.S. Senator Sam Brownback did not seek a third term, but instead successfully ran for Governor of Kansas. Republican nominee Jerry Moran won the open seat.

Background 
Sam Brownback was first elected to the Senate in 1996, replacing Bob Dole, who resigned to run for President. Brownback stated that he would not run for re-election in 2010 because of self-imposed term limits. Kansas is one of the most Republican states in the nation; no Democrat has been elected to either Senate seat since 1932.

Democratic primary

Candidates 
 Robert Conroy, retired railroad employee
 David Haley, state senator
 Lisa Johnston, administrator at Baker University
 Charles Schollenberger, retired communications executive
 Patrick Wiesner, attorney and CPA

Polling

Results

Republican primary

Candidates 
 Tom Little, accountant
 Bob Londerholm, former Attorney General of Kansas
 Jerry Moran, U.S. Representative
 Todd Tiahrt, U.S. Representative

Campaign 
The retirement of Brownback, a popular U.S. Senator, led to a heavily competitive primary election. Tiahrt, who was on the Committee of Appropriations, had been accused of excessive earmarking while he was in Congress. From 2006 to 2008, Tiahrt had requested and supported a total of 63 solo earmarks, costing $53.9 million. In the same period, Moran had requested and supported a total of 29 earmarks, with a pricetag of $13.4 million.

Endorsements

Moran

Tiahrt

Polling

Results

General election

Candidates

Major 
 Jerry Moran (R), U.S. Representative (campaign site, PVS, FEC)
 Lisa Johnston (D), Baker University administrator (campaign site, PVS, FEC)

Minor 
 Michael Dann (L) (campaign site, PVS)
 Joe Bellis (RE) (campaign site, PVS)

Campaign
Kansas is a very red state, where no Democrat has won a U.S. Senate election since 1932. After the primary, Moran chose not to release any more negative advertisements. Democrat Lisa Johnston ran a low-profile, quiet race. On election day, she won only two counties: Wyandotte County and Douglas County, while Moran won statewide by a landslide.

Debates 
The two never met for a debate.

Predictions

Polling

Fundraising

Results

References

External links 
 Kansas Secretary of State - Elections & Legislative
 U.S. Congress candidates for Kansas at Project Vote Smart
 Kansas U.S. Senate from OurCampaigns.com
 Campaign contributions from Open Secrets
 2010 Kansas Senate General Election: Jerry Moran (R) vs Lisa Johnston (D) graph of multiple polls from Pollster.com
 Election 2010: Kansas Senate from Rasmussen Reports

 2010 Kansas Senate Race from CQ Politics
 Race profile from The New York Times
 News coverage from The Midwest Democracy Project at The Kansas City Star
Official candidate sites (Archived)
Debates
 Kansas Senate Republican Primary Debate, C-SPAN, July 6, 2010
 Lisa Johnston for U.S. Senate
 Jerry Moran for U.S. Senate
 Charles Schollenberger for U.S. Senate
 Todd Tiahrt for U.S. Senate

2010 Kansas elections
Kansas
2010